Robert Yang is an academic, artist, and indie video game developer, whose work often explores gay subculture and the boundary between video games and art. His work focuses particularly on sociologically deviant and sometimes illegal sexual behavior. His projects include Borges adaptation Intimate, Infinite and The Tearoom, a game that involves soliciting sex in a public toilet. He is a former member of faculty at NYU Tisch School of the Arts's Game Center and curated their annual indie game exhibition in 2015.

Yang was also featured in the 2018 documentary Unforeseen Consequences: A Half-Life Documentary, created by Noclip, due to his work on the popular Half-Life Source remake, Black Mesa.

Selected works

Intimate, Infinite
Intimate, Infinite is an art game adaptation of Jorge Luis Borges's story "The Garden of Forking Paths", which itself played with genre. The game comprises three subgames which explore themes of repetition, infinity, and sudden endings, taken from the story.

Cobra Club
Cobra Club is a photo studio game that involves the player taking pictures of their character's penis. The player can interact with different NPCs and trade "dick pics" with each other. The game was banned by the live-streaming platform Twitch for its sexual content.

Hurt Me Plenty
Hurt Me Plenty is a sexually-explicit game based on BDSM subculture and explored the issue of negotiating consent.

Rinse and Repeat
Rinse and Repeat was released in 2015. It takes place at a public shower room. The player has to rub down other men. The game was widely banned on Twitch for its extensive nudity.

The Tearoom
The Tearoom (2017) alludes to the gay sexual practice of cottaging. Players must stand at a urinal and make eye contact with a neighbor until a power bar fills up and oral sex begins. Players must also avoid being spotted by police officers. Instead of penises, it shows guns. The game parodies or critiques aspects of other games: the presence of non-functioning toilets in other video games; the way games normally allow you to look at everything without being penalised; and the different attitudes of the video game industry to sex (largely prohibited) and violence (almost omni-present).

Other games
Yang's shorter games include Succulent, a game that allows you to have oral sex with an unknown orange object, possibly a corndog or a popsicle; Stick Shift (2015), a short driving game about pleasuring a gay car; and No Stars, Only Constellations, a stargazing game about relationship breakups and alien life. A few of Yang's games were released on Steam in a collection called Radiator 2. Yang has recently created 'We Dwel in Possibility' a free online experience.

References

External links
Yang's personal website / portfolio
Yang's page at NYU Game Center

Year of birth missing (living people)
Living people
Tisch School of the Arts faculty
Art games
Indie video game developers